The 1985 European Indoors  was a women's tennis tournament played on indoor carpet courts at the Saalsporthalle Allmend in Zurich, Switzerland that was part of the 1985 Virginia Slims World Championship Series. It was the second edition of the tournament and was held from 28 October through 3 November 1985. Third-seeded Zina Garrison won her second consecutive singles title at the event.

Finals

Singles
 Zina Garrison defeated  Hana Mandlíková 6–1, 6–3
 It was Garrison's 2nd singles title of the year and the 3rd of her career

Doubles
 Hana Mandlíková /  Andrea Temesvári defeated  Claudia Kohde-Kilsch /  Helena Suková 6–4, 3–6, 7–5

External links
 ITF tournament edition details
 Tournament draws

European Indoors
Zurich Open
1985 in Swiss tennis